Anguilla elects on territorial level a legislature. The House of Assembly has 11 members, 7 members elected for a five-year term in single-seat constituencies, 2 ex officio members and 2 nominated members. 
Anguilla has a multi-party system.

Latest election

See also
 Electoral calendar
 Electoral system

External links
Government Elections website